Toloxatone (Humoryl) is an antidepressant launched in 1984 in France by Sanofi Aventis for the treatment of depression. It was discontinued in 2002. It acts as a selective reversible inhibitor of MAO-A (RIMA).

See also 
 Befloxatone
 Cimoxatone

References 

Reversible inhibitors of MAO-A
Monoamine oxidase inhibitors
3-(4-methoxyphenyl)-2-oxazolidinones
Primary alcohols
3-Tolyl compounds